Christine Howser (born 1965) is an author from Indiana, United States.  After a prolonged hospitalization, she gave birth prematurely to twin sons named Steven and Timothy in October 1999, after 26 weeks of pregnancy. Both infants died shortly after.  She used the experience to write her first book, A Different Kind of Mother, for bereaved parents, published in 2002.  She holds an Associate's degree (1996) from Indiana University and a Bachelor of Science in organizational leadership from University of Indianapolis (2007).

References

1965 births
Living people
American autobiographers
American family and parenting writers
Writers from Indiana
Indiana University alumni
University of Indianapolis alumni
American biographers